is a Japanese former actress, singer, and model. After debuting as a junior model in 2001, Sawajiri transitioned to acting in 2002 and has starred in Break Through!, Shinobi: Heart Under Blade, and 1 Litre of Tears, for all of which she received several newcomer acting awards. Sawajiri also launched a singing career through the 2006 television drama Taiyō no Uta, where her first commercially-released song of the same name was certified Million by the Recording Industry Association of Japan. She later released solo music under the name Erika.

In 2007, Sawajiri went on hiatus after her public image was affected by her controversial statements and personal relationships. She later returned to acting in 2010 and starred in Helter Skelter, for which she received a Best Leading Actress nomination at the 36th Japan Academy Film Prize. On November 16, 2019, she was arrested for drug possession, and during her trial in January 2020, she stated that she had no plans on continuing her career.

Early life 

Erika Sawajiri was born in Nerima, Tokyo to a Japanese father and an Algerian (Kabyle, raised in France) mother, and is the youngest of three children. Her father owned 16 racehorses, including , giving her ample opportunities to engage in horseback riding as a child. Her father disappeared from home when she was nine years old and returned when she was in her third year at junior high school, only to die from cancer that year. Her second eldest brother died in a traffic accident when she was in her first year at high school. Her eldest brother is a former actor. Her mother managed a Mediterranean restaurant where she occasionally helped.

Career

In 1999, Sawajiri passed the Stardust audition after graduating from elementary school. She became part of the idol girl group Angel Eyes and began modeling for junior fashion magazines such as Cutie and Nicola. She later won the grand prize for the 2001 Seikore and became a regular on the BS news program Harajuku Launchers. In 2002, Sawajiri started her career in film as well as extending her modeling career as a gravure idol. Her first film was Mondai no nai Watashitachi.

Sawajiri became one of Fuji TV's Visual Queens in 2002. On the NTV variety show The Yoru mo Hit Parade, she became a regular from April till late June, shortly after leaving the program for the CX news program Chou VIP Fortune no Tobira from mid-June till late August. In November, she was on the CBC variety show Bijou Dokyuu and TBS show B-1. She was cast in the TBS TV drama Hotman. Her most notable role was in 1 Litre of Tears in 2005 when she portrayed a girl with the degenerative disease spinocerebellar degeneration.

Sawajiri first started her music career under the name "Kaoru Amane", the name of her character in her last drama, the TV adaptation of A Song to the Sun. The single went into number 1 in its second and fourth week. It was certified Triple Platinum for cell phone downloads of 750,000. On July 16, 2007, Erika released her debut single "Free", under the name "Erika". The single was immediately ranked on its first day as number one on the Oricon Charts. "Free" was certified Platinum for cell phone downloads of 250,000. Oricon stated that she is the only artist in 39 years to get their first two singles to hit number one since Hiroko Yakushimaru in 1983.

Sawajiri had planned to attend the 12th Busan International Film Festival on October 6, 2007, but she cancelled. Sawajiri and her mother both stated on separate occasions that she would return to Japan and make a comeback as soon as late summer 2009. In 2012, Sawajiri was originally scheduled to star in the live action film version of Space Battleship Yamato but was replaced by Meisa Kuroki.

In 2013, Sawajiri won Best Actress in a Leading Role at the 36th Japan Academy Awards for her performance in Helter Skelter.

After Sawajiri's November 2019 arrest, she was replaced in the television drama Kirin ga Kuru with Haruna Kawaguchi. She later stated in January 2020 that she had no plans on continuing her career. In February 2020, Avex ended their contract with her.

Personal life 

Sawajiri dated Tsuyoshi Takashiro as early as October 2007. She returned to Japan on March 29, 2008 after nearly three months in London with Takashiro. While in London, she attended a language school and has become fluent enough in English to handle ordinary conversation. On January 20, 2009, Sawajiri married Takashiro at Meiji Shrine in Yoyogi and had registered their marriage on January 7. On December 28, 2013, at the press conference, they announced they had divorced.

Drug arrest and trial

On November 16, 2019, Sawajiri was arrested on suspicion of possessing MDMA at her home. She reportedly admitted to using drugs for the past 10 years, including marijuana, LSD and cocaine. During her criminal trial on January 31, 2020, Sawajiri pled guilty to the charges and admitted she had been using drugs since she was 19 years old. On February 6, 2020, the Tokyo District Court sentenced her to 18 months in prison, suspended for three years.

Public image

During the premiere for Closed Note on September 29, 2007, Sawajiri, seemingly unhappy with the film, gave terse answers to the reporters. Subsequently, her actions were widely criticized for disrespecting her co-stars and the staff of the film. She issued an apology on her website and during her interview on Super Morning, where she also denied the rumors that she was being suspended by her management. The incident, compounded with Sawajiri's relationship with Takashiro, affected her public image greatly, and she withdrew her appearance at the Busan International Film Festival because of it. She later abruptly put her acting career on hiatus and Stardust Promotion eventually dropped her as an act in 2009. On September 1, 2010, in an interview with CNN Go, Sawajiri regretted apologizing and claimed that her management had pressured her to do so. Since the incident, the phrase , one of her responses to the reporters, became a viral phenomenon, and she was featured in a Snickers commercial in 2011 parodying herself.

Filmography

Films

Television

Music videos

Variety shows

DVDs

Publications

Discography

Singles

Soundtrack appearances

Awards and accolades

References

External links 
 Erika Sawajiri Official Website 
 Erika Sawajiri Official Website (Avex Management) 
 Kaoru Amane Official Website 
 

1986 births
Living people
People from Nerima
Japanese film actresses
Japanese female models
Japanese stage actresses
Japanese people of Algerian-Berber descent
Japanese television actresses
Japanese women pop singers
Sony Music Entertainment Japan artists
Studioseven Recordings artists
Avex Group talents
Avex Group artists
Former Stardust Promotion artists
Singers from Tokyo
21st-century Japanese singers
21st-century Japanese women singers